The Trager-Bierens T-3 Alibi is an American high-wing, V-tailed, single seat glider that was designed and constructed by Kempes Trager and John Bierens.

Design and development
The T-3 project was commenced in 1949, with the aircraft completed in 1951. The design aim was to produce a performance sailplane without having to build one from scratch. To achieve this goal the wings from a Laister-Kauffmann LK-10 were used.

Using the wood and fabric LK-10 wings, Trager and Bierens built a new-design fuselage from aluminium. The fuselage included a V-tail and a retractable monowheel landing gear. Later the wing was rebuilt to a new design that used the original spar. A new tail was also built at this time. The designers spent a lot of effort getting the wing surface smooth, which paid off later in contest results. The  span wing employs a NACA 4418 airfoil at the wing root and a NACA 4409 at the wing tip.

Only one T-3 was built. Originally registered as N909D, the registration was later changed to N9098. The aircraft is in the Experimental - Amateur-built category.

Operational history
The T-3 was entered in the 1955 US Nationals, flown by Kempes and came in first in that contest. The aircraft was crashed in August 1970 and then rebuilt by Fred Daams. The aircraft was then owned by a syndicate called Alibi Flyers which remained the registered owners in June 2011.

Specifications (T-3)

See also

References

External links
Three view drawing

1950s United States sailplanes
Homebuilt aircraft
Aircraft first flown in 1951
V-tail aircraft